KFMJ is a full service, commercial, classic hits music radio station in Ketchikan, Alaska, broadcasting on 99.9 MHz FM, is owned by Steven Rhyner through licensee KFMJ Radio LLC. and was launched on August 2, 1996. One of two commercial broadcast FM stations licensed to broadcast from Ketchikan, KFMJ is the only locally owned commercial radio station.

KFMJ airs some programming from Citadel Media's "Classic Hits" network (formerly ABC Radio) with the exception of their local KFMJ morning and afternoon shows.

Programming

Overview
KFMJ targets its programming to a core group of listeners: i.e., adults over the age of 35.

With its transmitter located atop High Mountain on Gravina Island (height above average terrain), across the Tongass Narrows from Ketchikan, KFMJ's signal provides maximum coverage to a wide area, including Saxman and other suburbs of Ketchikan on Revillagigedo Island, Metlakatla and vicinity to Prince of Wales Island communities to the west and Prince Rupert and northwestern coastal British Columbia to the south.

As one of a very few Southeast Alaska (Alaska's "Panhandle") stations live streaming audio on the Internet, KFMJ serves a national and international audience on the Web, too.

Local
KFMJ's live, local programming on weekdays includes:
 The Stuart Whyte Show (Goin' Home with Stu) from 4pm - 6pm. Born and raised in Chicago, Illinois, Whyte joined KFMJ in 2003.
 The "Travel and Technology Report" with Len Laurence is aired at 7:15 am weekdays.

News and weather updates are broadcast throughout the day.  KFMJ airs local news gathered by its news Department and top-of-the-hour news from USA Radio Network and is also affiliated with the ABC Radio Network and Associated Press.  Coast to Coast AM is aired after 9pm local time.

Starting in 2004, KFMJ became the home for Kayhi Kings & Lady Kings sports broadcasts at the request of Ketchikan High School. KFMJ provides play-by-play coverage of Boys & Girls Basketball, Boys Baseball and Boys Football. The station additionally carries coverage of select Metlakatla games and Little League Baseball. Games are simulcast online and archived on the KFMJ website.

Network feeds
Throughout most of the day on weekdays, KFMJ's programming is a satellite feed of Citadel Media's "Classic Hits" network (formerly ABC Radio) with the exception of their live, local morning and afternoon drive shows and Coast To Coast AM overnights.

Citadel has hired many new jocks for their satellite feed programming, replacing many of ABC Radio's personalities. Their new weekday lineup includes Maria Danza from 2am-6am, Dave Michaels from 9am-11am, Steve Gunn from 11am-4pm and 'Smokin' Kevin Browning from 6pm-9pm.

Coast To Coast AM with host George Noory is aired on weeknights from 9pm-2am.

The weekend programming lineup is satellite fed all day on Saturdays and most of the day on Sundays with the exception of the "Sunday Special," a live, local segment hosted by Bob Kern running from noon until 3pm local time. The "Sunday Special" features recordings of shows from "Radio's Golden Age" and "The Jean Shepherd Program."

Awards
KFMJ has won numerous awards  for its Commercial, Public Service, News and Comedy content from the Alaska Broadcasters Association, starting in 2002. The awards won by the station, by year, are as follows:

2002
Best Radio Commercial - Series - Division 2: "Narrows Inn - Thornlow's Bar"
2003
Best Radio Commercial - Series - Division 2: "WestCoast Cape Fox Lodge: Great Chefs"
Best Public Service Announcement - Single Entry - Division 2: "I've Got Dreams"
2004
Best Promotional Package - Division 2: "KFMJ Radio Fishing Derby"
Best Public Service Announcement - Single Entry - Division 2: "All-City Halloween Party"
Best Promotional Item - Division 2: "KFMJ Media Kit"
Best Comedy Feature - Division 2: "Gormley Goozley's Polka Music Challenge - Girl Scout Cookies"
2011
Goldie Award - Alaska's version of an "Emmy" award, recognizing excellence in radio/TV broadcasting.

References

External links

1996 establishments in Alaska
Buildings and structures in Ketchikan Gateway Borough, Alaska
Ketchikan, Alaska
Classic hits radio stations in the United States
Radio stations established in 1996
FMJ